Kjell-Idar Juvik (born May 21, 1966) is a Norwegian politician for the Norwegian Labour Party.

Born in Hemnesberget, Helgeland, Kjell-Idar Juvik has been a member of Hemnes municipality council since 1987, and served as mayor from 2003–2011. Juvik gained national media attention as one of the four mayors that fronted his municipality and seven others in the Terra Securities scandal.

He is the nephew of former parliament member Sverre Johan Juvik.

References

1966 births
Living people
People from Hemnes
Labour Party (Norway) politicians
Mayors of places in Nordland
21st-century Norwegian politicians